Banksula is a genus of harvestman in family Phalangodidae. Currently, ten species are described, all of them endemic to California, United States.

The genus is named in honor of Nathan Banks, who described the type species.

Species
 Banksula californica (Banks, 1900)
 Banksula galilei Briggs, 1974
 Banksula grahami Briggs, 1974
 Banksula grubbsi Briggs & Ubick, 1981
 Banksula incredula Ubick & Briggs, 2002
 Banksula martinorum Briggs & Ubick, 1981
 Banksula melones Briggs, 1974
 Banksula rudolphi Briggs & Ubick, 1981
 Banksula tuolumne Briggs, 1974
 Banksula tutankhamen Ubick & Briggs, 2002

References
 's Biology Catalog: Phalangodidae

Harvestmen
Taxonomy articles created by Polbot